The Marañón thrush (Turdus maranonicus) is a species of bird in the family Turdidae. It is found in far southern Ecuador and northern Peru. Its natural habitats are subtropical or tropical dry forests and subtropical or tropical moist lowland forests.

References

Marañón thrush
Marañón thrush
Birds of the Peruvian Andes
Marañón thrush
Marañón thrush
Taxonomy articles created by Polbot